Bangabandhu Sheikh Mujib Medical College (BSMMC), formerly known as Faridpur Medical College, is one of the most prestigious government-run medical colleges in Bangladesh. Operating since 1992, BSMMC has educated worldclass doctors to serve the well-being of humanity. It is located in Faridpur Town, headquarters of Faridpur District. It is affiliated with University of Dhaka as a constituent college.

It offers a five-year course of study leading to a Bachelor of Medicine, Bachelor of Surgery (MBBS) degree. A one-year internship after graduation is compulsory for all graduates. The degree is recognised by the Bangladesh Medical and Dental Council. It also offers the D-Ortho (Diploma in Orthopedics) course, which is a two-year postgraduation degree on Orthopedics. The BSMMC Hospital is accredited as being one of the best hospitals in the country.

The college is associated with the 500-bed Bangabandhu Sheikh Mujib Medical College Hospital. Bangabandhu Sheikh Mujib Medical College Journal is the hospital's official journal.

History
The government of Bangladesh established Bangabandhu Sheikh Mujib Medical College in 1992. Since 1992 after establishment, it has been offering the height standard of medical teaching to enable its students to be competent  to serve the humanity. Then to now, this college has got a huge preference in the public medical college Sector in Bangladesh. The institute started its journey on the campus of Medical Assistant Training School, Faridpur. In 2017, the college was shifted to the newly constructed campus in West Khabashpur, Faridpur.

In 2011, the management of the college resolved to rename it Sheikh Hasina Medical College. In 2014, it was reported that Sheikh Hasina vetoed the name change.

Students at the college demonstrated in 2015, calling for the reinstatement of the "carry on" examination system. The Bachelor of Medicine, Bachelor of Surgery (MBBS) degree programme is divided into four parts by the first, second, third, and final professional examinations. If a student fails one of these exams, they may sit it again six months later. Under the 2002 "carry on" system, students could continue taking classes in the next academic session while preparing to retake an exam. This system was strongly favoured by medical students, but strongly opposed by their teachers. The Bangladesh Medical and Dental Council eliminated "carry on" in 2013, after which students who failed a professional exam were not allowed to continue classes until they had passed it, causing them to lose up to a year in the process.
In April 2021, The government has changed the names of Faridpur Medical College and Faridpur Medical College Hospital to Bangabandhu Sheikh Mujib Medical College and Bangabandhu Sheikh Mujib Medical College Hospital. The names have been changed after the father of the nation Bangabandhu Sheikh Mujibur Rahman."The order issued with the approval of the authority will be implemented immediately," says a Ministry of Health and Family Welfare gazette signed by Md Ali Noor, secretary of Medical Education & Family Welfare Division.

Campus

On 15 June 2017, BSMMC permanently shifted to their beautiful new campus which has twenty-five 5-6 storied  buildings. The college has a total of five hostels. One for boys, two for girls, and two for intern doctors. They have also a library, a big playground, a volleyball court, a badminton court, a beautiful mosque, etc.
Also, Their transport system is very high quality. Always on time, Safe and time-consuming, Better Environment, Reduce Traffic, Reduce pollution, It can teach time management, Money saver.

In new campus with its associated hospital, students are learning the fundamentals of human anatomy, physiology, biochemistry, human disease pathology and also being well-trained in treating patients with medicine, surgery, gynaecology and other aspects of sub specialised sectors.

There is a nursing college affiliated with the hospital. It provides training for young nurses. There are also hostels for nurses near the hospital.

Administration & organizations

The college is affiliated with Dhaka University as a constituent college. The principal of the college is Prof. Dr. Md. Mustafizur Rahman. The Vice-Principal of the college is Dr. Dilruba Zeba. The director of the hospital is Prof. Dr. Saiful Islam

There are six organizations and clubs :
 Sandhani-BSMMC Unit(সন্ধানী)   
 Medicine Club-BSMMC Unit
 Prateeti(প্রতীতি)
 Engineer Khandaker Mosharraf Hossain Blood Donation Club
 Film & Music Society
BSMMC Young Researchers Club :  Upholding the researcher mind of the student and promoting the medical research among the students of Bangabadhu Sheikh Mujib Medical College

Academics

The college offers a five-year course of study, approved by the Bangladesh Medical and Dental Council (BMDC), leading to a Bachelor of Medicine, Bachelor of Surgery (MBBS) degree from University of Dhaka. After passing the final professional examination, there is a compulsory one-year internship. The internship is a prerequisite for obtaining registration from the BMDC to practice medicine.

Admission for Bangladeshis to the MBBS programme at all medical colleges in Bangladesh (government and private) is conducted centrally by the Directorate General of Health Services (DGHS). It administers a written multiple choice question exam simultaneously throughout the country. Candidates are admitted based primarily on their score on this test, although grades at Secondary School Certificate (SSC) and Higher Secondary School Certificate (HSC) level also play a part. Admission for foreign students is based on their SSC and HSC grades. As of October 2020, the college is allowed to admit 180 students annually.

Bangabandhu Sheikh Mujib Medical College Journal (BSMMCJ) is the official journal of the college. It is a peer-reviewed, open access journal, published semi-annually in January and July. It accepts original research articles, review articles on topics of current interest, and interesting case reports. Submissions should not have been published previously, and should not be submitted to multiple publications concurrently.

Faculty & departments 
Pre-Clinical
 Anatomy
 Biochemistry
 Physiology
 Paraclinical
 Community Medicine
 Forensic Medicine
 Pharmacology 
 Pathology
 Microbiology

Clinical
 Medicine
 Neuromedicine
 Ortho Surgery
 Burn & Plastic Surgery
 Cardiology
 Pediatrics and Neonatology
 Paediatric Surgery
 Ear, Nose, Throat (Otorhinolaryngology)
 Anesthesiology
 Ophthalmology
 Obstetrics & Gynecology
 Gastroenterology
 Radiology
 Dentistry
 Blood Transfusion Medicine
 Skin & VD
 Orthopedix
 Urology
 Nephrology
 Respiratory Medicine
 Physical Medicine
 Psychiatry

Extracurricular activities 
Each and every year the students celebrate the national days by performing cultural programme. Also the students celebrate the Iftar Party, Swarasti Puja, Pahela Baisakh, Indoor Games Competition in the college campus. The New Hostel building is provided with modern indoor sports facilities for the upcoming new generation doctors of this very medical college. The students celebrate their 30 days, 100 days, year ending, and batch programs on campus.

Alumni association 
Bangabandhu Sheikh Mujib Medical College graduates have a strong alumni presence in United States, UK and Canada. BSMMC Alumni Association Abroad is an organization of the alumni who are currently living abroad. The association is involved in exchange of skills and education with the college. They provide scholarship every year to the students of BSMMC.

Recognition 
The degree is recognised by the Bangladesh Medical and Dental Council. Graduates of the medical college are eligible for USMLE and PLAB examination. Bangabandhu Sheikh Mujib Medical College is listed in the IMED.

See also
 List of medical colleges in Bangladesh (BSMMC Rank-13)

References

Medical colleges in Bangladesh
Hospitals in Bangladesh
Educational institutions established in 1992
1992 establishments in Bangladesh